Yang Zhe (born 14 July 1991) is a Chinese weightlifter. He competed for men's 105 kg weightlifting at Guangzhou Asia 2010 and won the gold medal. He also won the gold medal in 2014 Asian Games. He competed at the 2016 Summer Olympics in the Men's 105 kg.

Major results

References

External links

Chinese male weightlifters
1991 births
Living people
Asian Games medalists in weightlifting
Weightlifters at the 2010 Asian Games
Weightlifters at the 2014 Asian Games
Weightlifters at the 2016 Summer Olympics
Olympic weightlifters of China
Asian Games gold medalists for China
Medalists at the 2010 Asian Games
Medalists at the 2014 Asian Games
World Weightlifting Championships medalists
People from Chaoyang, Liaoning
Weightlifters from Liaoning
21st-century Chinese people